Rondslottet is the highest mountain in the Rondane mountain range in Innlandet county, Norway. There is a trail leading to the summit.

Name
The first part of the name comes from the word  which was probably the original name of the nearby lake Rondvatnet. Many of the mountains near the lake were then named after this lake. The last element of the name is the finite form of the Norwegian word  which means 'palace'.

See also
 List of highest points of Norwegian counties
 List of mountains of Norway

References

Guidebooks

Mountains of Innlandet
Folldal
Dovre